Sinchang(Soonchunhyang Univ.) Station is a railway station on Seoul Metropolitan Subway Line 1 and the Janghang Line in Asan, South Korea. It is the southern terminus for metro trains on Line 1.

References

Seoul Metropolitan Subway stations
Railway stations in South Chungcheong Province
Metro stations in Asan
Railway stations opened in 1922